Mallandur is a village in Chikmagalur district in Karnataka, India. It has an elevation of 1243m. It is a popular destination for tourists. Languages spoken in Mallandur include primarily Kannada and Tulu, Konkani, as well as Marathi, Hindi, Telugu And Gujarati.

See also 
Muthodi wildlife sanctuary
Attigundi

References 

Villages in Chikkamagaluru district